Hirekudi  is a village in the southern state of Karnataka, India. It is located in the Chikodi taluk of Belgaum district in Karnataka.

Demographics
Hirekudi is a large village with total 2294 families residing. The Hirekudi village has population of 11946 of which 6111 are males while 5835 are females as per Population Census 2011.

In Hirekudi village population of children with age 0-6 is 1534 which makes up 12.84% of total population of village. Average Sex Ratio of Hirekudi village is 955 which is lower than Karnataka state average of 973. Child Sex Ratio for the Hirekudi as per census is 889, lower than Karnataka average of 948.

Hirekudi village has lower literacy rate compared to Karnataka. In 2011, literacy rate of Hirekudi village was 74.21% compared to 75.36% of Karnataka. In Hirekudi Male literacy stands at 82.94% while female literacy rate was 65.17%.

In Hirekudi village out of total population, 6290 were engaged in work activities. 66.12% of workers describe their work as Main Work (Employment or Earning more than 6 Months) while 33.88% were involved in Marginal activity providing livelihood for less than 6 months. Of 6290 workers engaged in Main Work, 2383 were cultivators (owner or co-owner) while 760 were Agricultural labourer.

As per constitution of India and Panchyati Raaj Act, Hirekudi village is administrated by Sarpanch (Head of Village) who is elected representative of village. [1]

Geography 
It  has an average elevation of 595 metres (1952.1 feet).The town has an area of 25 km2. and is situated amidst hills, Temperature varies from a maximum of 35 °C to a minimum of 18 °C, maximum average rainfall annually is 826.64mm.

Nearby Places 
 Chikodi - Ganesh Temple, near Bus Stand on top of hill is very famous temple of lord Ganesha. There is one more temple known as Parati Nagalingeswara temple, is located about 2.5 km away from the bus stand.
 Yadur - Shree Veerbhardra temple is situated in the holy Shri Kseshtra Yadur, on the banks of river Krishna is located about 20 km from Chikodi
 Karoshi - Shree Basavanna temple is situated in the holy place of Karoshi, is located about 7 km from Chikodi. It is having a famous Darga, also this indicates the communal harmony it has. This place is agriculturally sound.
 Shantigiri Jain Temple - It is about 10 km from Chikodi. This village can be considered one of the highlighted centers of Jain history, Where the shri shantigiri Tirth is situated.
 Nagarmunoli is one village near Chikodi it is known for its Ayurvedic Medicine.
 Chinchani - Having Allamprabhu Sidd Sansthan Math, Shri Basaveshwar temple (Gudadagind basavan) located near about 5 km from chikodi.
 Toranahalli- famous Bhagavan Hanuman temple is present in this village near 10 km from Chikodi...
 Lakkavva Temple- famous temple known   in the  village which is in the laxmi nagar of Basavanal Gadde 
 Hanuman Temple- the temple is located in the Basav Nagar of Basavanal Gadde

Educational Institutions 
 Minority Morarji Desai Residential School, Hirekudi Chikkodi.  
 Government Kannada Medium Primary and High School
 Government Urdu Medium Primary School

See also
 Belgaum
 Districts of Karnataka

References

External links
 http://Belgaum.nic.in/

Villages in Belagavi district